Dabasun Nor was a former salt lake in the northwest corner of the Ordos Loop in what is now the Hanggin Banner of Ordos Prefecture, Inner Mongolia, China.

Names
Dabasun Nor is a romanization of the lake's Mongolian name, which means simply "Salt Lake". The same name also appears as Da-ba-sun Nor, Dabasun-Nor, Dabsoun Nor, and Dabsoun-Noor.

It was also known to foreign geographers as Charamannai Nor, Kara-Mannaï-Omo, Karamanni Omo, Hara Manlay Nuur, and Dalay Dabasun, the last meaning "Sea" or "Ocean of Salt", although these names were unknown to locals by the 20th century.

Geography
In the 1840s, the lake was reckoned as about 20 lis (about ) in circumference.

The area surrounding the lake was once so saturated with salt and natron as to glow white and was scattered with thorn-covered yardangs. The aridity and salinity precluded almost any trees from growing.

History

In the 1840s, Huc and Gabet followed a caravan route south of the lake. The few freshwater springs that occurred were marked at the time by long poles, each topped with a small flag. Their journey came just a decade after Tao Zhu's liberalization of the imperial salt monopoly, and Huc reported that the lake's salt trade had become so extensive as to supply several nearby provinces. This made the area economically important for trade and popular as a destination along caravan routes, but did little to help locals for whom the salt was nearly worthless. The salinity of the ground also kept them from growing any crops or keeping cattle, although camels and sheep were able to thrive on the local thorny vegetation. Wild lizards, deer, and rabbits were also abundant into the 20th century.

The lake was still exporting large quantities of salt into the 1930s, but by the early 20th century the revenue was being kept by the local Mongol lord at Hanggin and its reduced economic importance meant that most trade followed the Yellow River around the curve of the Ordos, only bothering with crossing directly across the desert when summer flooding made the river valley impractical.

See also
 Salt in Chinese history
 List of lakes and saltwater lakes of China

References

Citations

Bibliography
 .
 
 , Boris de Zirkoff's rev. ed. 1972, reprinted 2000.
 .
 .
 .
 .
 , reprinted 1926.
 .
 .

Saline lakes
Former lakes of Asia
Lakes of China
Lakes of Inner Mongolia